Dongping may refer to the following in China:

Dongping County (东平县), Tai'an, Shandong
Dongping Lake, in the eponymous county
Dongping National Forest Park (东平国家森林公园), in Chongming Island, Shanghai
Towns
Written as "东平镇":
Dongping, Yongchun County, Fujian
Dongping, Zhenghe County, Fujian
Dongping, Yangdong County, Guangdong
Dongping, Bobai County, in Bobai County, Guangxi
Dongping, Dongping County, Shandong
Dongping, Chongming County, Shanghai

Written as "东坪镇":
Dongping, Ruyuan County, in Ruyuan Yao Autonomous County, Guangdong
Dongping, Anhua County, in Anhua County, Hunan
Dongping, Zibo, in Zichuan District, Zibo, Shandong

Written as "东屏镇":
Dongping, Lishui County, Jiangsu
Dongping, Zhenlai County, Jilin
Dongping, Dongtou County, Zhejiang

Townships (东坪乡)
Dongping Township, Tenzhu County, in Tenzhu Tibetan Autonomous County, Gansu
Dongping Township, Qiaojia County, in Qiaojia County, Yunnan

Subdistrict (东坪街道)
 Dongping, Xiangtan (东坪街道), a subdistrict of Yuetang District in Xiangtan City, Hunan Province.